The Romania national rugby sevens team has competed in the World Rugby Sevens Series and in the Rugby World Cup Sevens, but not yet in the Summer Olympic Games. They are currently competing in the Rugby Europe Sevens Trophy Series.

Tournament history

Summer Olympics

Rugby World Cup Sevens

Recent Results

2018 European Sevens Trophy

Zagreb

Pool B

Knockout stage

Cup

Šiauliai

Pool A

Knockout stage

Cup

Standings

2019 European Sevens Grand Prix

Moscow

Pool A

Knockout stage

Bowl

Łódź

Pool A

Knockout stage

Bowl

Standings

Players

Current squad
The following 12 players were called up for the 2021 Rugby Europe Sevens Trophy Series on the 9th of July 2021.

<noinclude>

Coaches

Current coaching staff
The current coaching staff of the Romanian national sevens team:

See also
 Rugby union in Romania
 Romania national rugby union team
 Romania national under-20 rugby union team
 Romania women's national rugby sevens team

External links
 Official website

References

Rugby union in Romania
Romania
National rugby sevens teams